Ernest Collins (18 February 1851 – 20 April 1914) was a British water supply engineer.

He was born in Harefield, Middlesex, the fifth son of the Rev. Robert Cave Wood  Collins, then Vicar of Harefield, and his wife, Rachel Vernor Miles. He was educated at Aldenham Grammar School and Neuchâtel.

After serving his articles to Messrs. Ruston, Proctor and Company, of Lincoln, he took a post with Hopkins, Gilkes & Company.

In 1880, he joined the staff of the New River Company, which provided a supply of clean water to London via an artificial waterway. He was their chief engineer when the company was transferred to the Metropolitan Water Board and in 1905 was appointed Engineer of the New River District, a position he held until his retirement in 1911. He was elected a Member of the Institute of Civil Engineers (M.I.C.E) in 1892.

In 1883, Collins introduced the almost universally adopted system of testing and stamping water fittings.

He was also Chairman of Council of the Hampstead General Hospital.

He died in Christchurch, Hampshire in 1914, aged 63.

References

1851 births
1914 deaths
English civil engineers
Hydraulic engineers
People from Harefield